The Golden Horse Award for Best Adapted Screenplay is given at the Golden Horse Film Awards.

Winners and nominees

2000s

2010s

2020s

References

External links 
  
  

Golden Horse Film Awards